Everest VR is an interactive media experience that simulates in virtual reality the ascent to the summit of Mount Everest.

Content 

Everest VR is a virtual reality experience about two hours in length with no gameplay elements. The experience begins with a narration about Mount Everest and its dangerous Khumbu Icefall. The player crosses a metal ladder to cross a deep crevasse and proceeds up the mountain. Several detours quicken the player's ascension.

Development 

The Icelandic virtual reality content company Solfar developed Everest VR as one of two games for release in 2016. They constructed their virtual Everest using stereophotogrammetry, which used supercomputers to combine photographs taken from a variety of angles to generate a color, three-dimensional image in high resolution. The Icelandic special effects company Reykjavik Visual Effects (RVX) partnered with Solfar to complete the game.

References

Further reading

External links 

 

2016 video games
Mount Everest in fiction
Simulation video games
Video games developed in Iceland
Video games set in Nepal
Virtual reality games
Windows games
Windows-only games